The Ethnological Museum, Addis Ababa, in Ethiopia, is a public institution dedicated to ethnology and culture.  The Ethnological Museum houses anthropological, musicological and cultural objects. The Ethnological Museum is the first university museum in Ethiopia. The Museum is located in the main Campus of Addis Ababa University which houses the Institute of Ethiopian Studies.

Establishment 
The Ethnological Museum in Addis Ababa was established in 1950, largely based on the collections of old Italian zoological species and ethnographic artifacts by the first batch of graduates of the College. The initiator of the idea of the museum came from Stanislaw Chojnaki who was the former chief librarian of the University College of Addis Ababa.

Museum sections 

 Anthropology Collection
 Ethno-Musicological Collection
 Art Gallery
 Philatelic Collection
 Numismatics Collection

Galleries
Building

Emperor Haile Selassie's artifacts

See also
 List of museums in Ethiopia

References

 Museums in Ethiopia
Ethnographic museums in Africa